Earth orbit rendezvous (EOR) is a method for conducting round trip human flights to the Moon, involving the use of space rendezvous to assemble, and possibly fuel, components of a translunar vehicle in low Earth orbit.  It was considered and ultimately rejected in favor of lunar orbit rendezvous (LOR) for NASA's Apollo program of the 1960s and 1970s, mainly because LOR does not require a spacecraft big enough to both make the return trip from Earth orbit to splashdown in the ocean, and a soft landing on the lunar surface. Three decades later, it was planned to be used for Project Constellation, until that program's cancellation in October 2010.

Gemini and Agena target vehicle
The Agena target vehicle (ATV) was used for testing Earth orbit rendezvous in the NASA Gemini Program. Gemini 6 and Gemini 7 rendezvoused in orbit in 1965, but without Agena. Next, Gemini 8 successfully docked  with the Agena on March 16, 1966. The Agena-Gemini rendezvous also achieved other objectives in later Gemini launches, including docked orbital maneuvering (Gemini 10 and Gemini 11), inspection of the abandoned Gemini 8 ATV (Gemini 10) and space walks (Gemini 12).

Apollo

The EOR proposal for Apollo consisted of using a series of small rockets half the size of a Saturn V to put different components of a spacecraft to go to the Moon in orbit around the Earth, then assemble them in orbit.  Experiments of Project Gemini involving docking with the Agena target vehicle were designed partly to test the feasibility of this program.

In the end, NASA employed the Lunar Orbit Rendezvous for the Apollo Program: a  Saturn V would simultaneously lift both the Apollo Command and Lunar Modules into low Earth orbit, and then the Saturn V third stage would fire again (Trans-lunar injection) to send both spacecraft to the Moon.

Constellation
This mode had been revived for Project Constellation as the Earth Departure Stage (EDS) and Altair (LSAM), which would be launched into low Earth orbit on the Ares V rocket.  The EDS and Altair would  be met by the separately launched Orion (CEV). Once joined in low Earth orbit, the three would then travel out to the Moon and the Orion/Altair combination would fly a lunar orbit rendezvous flight pattern.

References

Spaceflight
Apollo program
Space rendezvous